Karen Kai-Lan Chau (born 1978) is an American artist and creator of the children's television series Ni Hao, Kai-Lan for Nickelodeon. Ni Hao, Kai-Lan is based on the childhood memories of Chau, growing up in a bicultural (Chinese-American) household. Her childhood included several years in Plano, Texas as a student at Plano Senior High School, before her family settled in Los Angeles. The Ni Hao, Kai-Lan series was nominated for an Emmy award in spring 2010. Chau has been the director of intellectual property development for Disney since 2014.

Chau graduated with a degree in digital art from the University of California, Irvine, in 2000. She is also a painter and sculptor whose 2D and 3D work was shown for the first time in New York City in 2010.

References

Living people
1978 births
American artists of Chinese descent
Place of birth missing (living people)
American artists
University of California, Irvine alumni
People from Los Angeles